Robert Powell (born 1932 in Benoit, Mississippi) is an American composer, organist, and choir director.

Powell earned a Bachelor of Music degree from Louisiana State University with a focus on organ and composition.  He studied with Alec Wyton at Union Theological Seminary in New York, and he was also Wyton's assistant at The Episcopal Cathedral of St. John the Divine.  For three years (1965–1968), he served St. Paul's School (Concord, New Hampshire) as Director of Music.  Later, Powell was Director of Music and Organist of Christ Church (Episcopal) of Greenville, South Carolina from 1968 to 2003.  He has composed in nearly all genres common to church music, including anthems, service music, hymn concertatos, organ music, music for handbell choir, and large-scale oratorios.  Powell's conservative, neo-Romantic style stems from his practical approach to composition.  According to Powell himself, he writes for "choirs of twenty-five because that's what most choirs are.  When you come right down to it, most choirs are not of cathedral ability or size.   My pieces are all practical things and useful for specific occasions."  His publications appear in The Hymnal 1982 as well as in the catalogs of most of the significant American publishers of church music.  According to publisher GIA, Powell is "a composer whose output bridges denominational boundaries and who is able to serve the larger Church. He has made ecumenical sharing a reality–-and always with a genteel touch."  Powell is an active member of the Association of Anglican Musicians and is a Fellow of the American Guild of Organists.

References

External links
 GIA Publications' biography page for Robert Powell
 Selah Publishing's page for Robert Powell
 Augsburg Fortress Publishing's page for Robert Powell
 Paraclete Press's page for Robert Powell
 Ascención Recordings Artist Representation

American male composers
21st-century American composers
1932 births
Living people
People from Benoit, Mississippi
Composers for pipe organ
American organists
American male organists
21st-century American keyboardists
21st-century organists
21st-century American male musicians